FK Beluša is a Slovak association football club located in Beluša. It currently plays in 3.liga západ.

Current squad
As of 9 June 2019

Colors and badge 
Its colors are white and blue.

References
http://www.fkbelusa.sk/sk/

External links
Official website 
Facebook page 
Beluša portal 

Football clubs in Slovakia
Association football clubs established in 1951
1951 establishments in Slovakia